Opisthopappus is a genus of Chinese flowering plants in the chamomile tribe within the daisy family.

 Species
 Opisthopappus longilobus  - Hebei
 Opisthopappus taihangensis - Hebei, Henan, Shanxi

References

Anthemideae
Endemic flora of China
Asteraceae genera